24 Hour Rental is a Canadian television comedy series, created by Frank Massa and was originally optioned in 2008, which was finally picked up by the Canadian Super Channel Network In 2012. It   premiered on Super Channel in 2014. The series stars Romano Orzari as Tracker, a disgraced former mafia boss now running a 24-hour video rental shop which is really a front for his continued attempts to reestablish his power in the organized crime circuit. The core cast also includes Aaron Berg, Adam Kenneth Wilson, Michael Biehn, Marc Senior, Kate Ross, Leslie Seiler and Gavin Crawford, with supporting performers including Vlasta Vrana, Aidan Devine, Salvatore Antonio, Joe Pingue, Judah Katz, Mike Smith, and Simon D. Scott.

The series is filmed in Hamilton, Ontario.

References

External links

2014 Canadian television series debuts
2014 Canadian television series endings
Super Channel (Canadian TV channel) original programming
Television shows filmed in Hamilton, Ontario
2010s Canadian sitcoms
2010s Canadian workplace comedy television series